María Gracia Andrea Omegna Vergara (born November 10, 1984) is a Chilean actress. She is known for the productions Dama y obrero and Papá a la deriva, as well as the film Joven y alocada.

Career 
She studied theater at the Finis Terrae University, where she was also part of the institution's student federation. Shortly before graduating from it, her aunt, the actress Berta Lasala, encouraged her to participate in a casting on Channel 13 for a television series. Although she was not among her interests to act on television, she went, but she did not stay. A year later, Herval Abreu called her for another audition and she entered the cast of Lola. She later she would participate in Corazón rebelde (Chilean version of the Argentine Rebelde Way), playing Pilar Ortúzar.

María Gracia was a theater woman, from a very young age she was part of the company "Lafamiliateatro", with whom she made some productions, including a tour to Bolivia and with whom she continues to collaborate until today, becoming the official presenter of the Santiago Off Festival, organized by your company in 2012 and 2013.

In 2010 she was hired by TVN, where she achieved her first leading role in a telenovela, this time as Leonor Encina in the historical television series Martín Rivas, where she stars in a loving romance with the protagonist Diego Muñoz.

She made her film debut with the film The Life of Fish directed by Matías Bize, a Goya Award-winning film.

In 2011, for the second time she takes a leading role in the production of Témpano, playing Amparo Benavente, a woman who comes for cold revenge. This dramatic production was recorded in Puerto Natales and Santiago.

In 2012, for the third time in a row, she takes a leading role, this time in the successful daytime production Dama y obrero, playing Ignacia Villavicencio, a millionaire married woman who ends up falling in love with a poor worker played by Francisco Pérez-Bannen.

That same year, she also obtained a leading role in the cinema, in the film Joven y alocada, directed by Marialy Rivas and based on the homonymous book by Camila Gutiérrez, in which she plays Antonia, a university student who is the niece of the director of an evangelical channel, who is romantically involved with the protagonist, Daniela, a bisexual student who recounts her controversial experiences and the conflicts that occur between her conservative family contrasted with her rebellious sexuality, played by Alicia Rodríguez. The film was released worldwide on January 21, 2012, at the Sundance Film Festival, where it won the award for best screenplay.

In 2013 she plays the lawyer and human rights activist Carmen Hertz in the Chilevisión miniseries Ecos del Desierto, directed by Andrés Wood.

After five years on TVN, in 2015 she emigrated to the Mega to play the role of Violeta Padilla in the television series Papá a la deriva, where she also shares the limelight with actor Gonzalo Valenzuela. The following year, she would make the first night production of her, the Chilean version of Señores Papis, where she also shares with the actors Jorge Zabaleta, Francisco Melo and Diego Muñoz.

By 2018, she would be back in an evening production of Mega, Si yo fuera rico, starring Gonzalo Valenzuela again, also with Mariana Loyola and Jorge Zabaleta. Since 2015 she has been in a relationship with the Chilean actor Gonzalo Valenzuela, whom she met during Papá a la deriva. On September 30, 2019, Anka was born, her first daughter with Gonzalo Valenzuela. In 2021 they announced their separation.

In 2021 she starred in Edificio Corona as Javiera Sandoval, a successful Mega telenovela.

Filmography

Film

Telenovelas

TV series

References 

1984 births
Chilean television actors
Chilean film actors
People from Santiago
Actors from Santiago
21st-century Chilean actors
Living people